The Chemical History of a Candle was the title of a series of six lectures on the chemistry and physics of flames given by Michael Faraday at the Royal Institution in 1848, as part of the series of Christmas lectures for young people founded by Faraday in 1825 and still given there every year.

The lectures described the different zones of combustion in the candle flame and the presence of carbon particles in the luminescent zone. Demonstrations included the production and examination of the properties of hydrogen, oxygen, nitrogen and carbon dioxide gases. An electrolysis cell is demonstrated, first in the electroplating of platinum conductors by dissolved copper, then the production of hydrogen and oxygen gases and their recombination to form water. The properties of water itself are studied, including its expansion while freezing (iron vessels are burst by this expansion), and the relative volume of steam produced when water is vaporized. Techniques for weighing gases on a balance are demonstrated. Atmospheric pressure is described and its effects demonstrated.

Faraday emphasizes that several of the demonstrations and experiments performed in the lectures may be performed by children "at home" and makes several comments regarding proper attention to safety.

The lectures were first printed as a book in 1861.

In 2016, Bill Hammack published a video series of the lectures supplemented by commentary and a companion book. Faraday's ideas are still used as the basis for open teaching about energy in modern primary and secondary schools

Contents of the six lectures

Lecture 1: A Candle: The Flame - Its Sources - Structure - Mobility - Brightness

Lecture 2: Brightness of the Flame - Air necessary for Combustion - Production of Water

Lecture 3: Products: Water from the Combustion - Nature of Water - A Compound - Hydrogen

Lecture 4: Hydrogen in the Candle - Burns into Water - The Other Part of Water - Oxygen

Lecture 5: Oxygen present in the Air - Nature of the Atmosphere - Its Properties - Other Products from the Candle - Carbonic Acid - Its Properties

Lecture 6: Carbon or Charcoal - Coal Gas Respiration and its Analogy to the Burning of a Candle - Conclusion

Reception

According to Frank Wilczek:

According to Bill Griffith, F.R.S.C., of Imperial College London:

References

External links

  Full text of The Chemical History Of A Candle from Project Gutenberg
 
  Full text of The Chemical History Of A Candle from Internet Archive, with illustrations. 
 Picture book adaptation of Faraday's lecture.
 
 

1861 non-fiction books
Chemistry books
History of chemistry
Candles
Michael Faraday
Books of lectures